Skaterdater is a 1965 American short student film.  It was produced by Marshal Backlar, and written and directed by Noel Black.

Summary
The film tells a story with no dialogue. The group of boy skaters are suddenly at a point when one of the boys sees a young girl, and becomes interested in her. This causes a rift with a second boy, who challenges him to a skating duel that goes down a hilly street.  The first boy loses; however, he gets the girl, and shortly, a few other girls are seen and become interested in the boys, too. The surf rock-esque soundtrack was composed by Mike Curb and Nick Venet with Davie Allan and the Arrows playing "Skaterdater Rock".

Production
The skateboarders were members of the neighborhood Imperial Skateboard Club from Torrance, California. Their names are Gary Hill, Gregg Carroll, Mike Mel, Bill McKaig, Gary Jennings, Bruce McKaig and Rick Anderson.  Melissa Mallory played the girl of the interest of one of the boy skaters.  Most of the action shots were taken in Torrance, Redondo Beach, and Palos Verdes Estates. The final shot was Averill Park in San Pedro.

Reception and legacy
It was the first film on skateboarding. It was distributed theatrically, both domestically and internationally, by United Artists. It was reviewed extensively by media outlets including Time magazine. It was the winner of the Palme d'Or for Best Short Film at the 1966 Cannes Film Festival. It was also nominated for an Academy Award in the Best Short Subject category. First prizes in international film festivals included Moscow and Venice.

Skaterdater has had lasting cultural relevance in the film industry. It has been the subject of scholarly articles on cinematography, and entrepreneur Steve Mariotti included it in a 2017 list of "15 films every entrepreneur must see".

The Academy Film Archive preserved Skaterdater in 2010.

See also
List of American films of 1965

References

External links
Skaterdater (entire film)

1965 short films
1960s sports films
1965 films
Films set in Los Angeles
Films shot in Los Angeles
Films without speech
Short Film Palme d'Or winners
Skateboarding videos
American student films
1960s English-language films